"Out Out" is a song by British DJs Joel Corry and Jax Jones, featuring British singer Charli XCX and American rapper Saweetie performing vocals. The single was released on 13 August 2021 by Asylum Records UK. "Out Out" peaked at number six on the UK Singles Chart.

Background and composition
"Out Out" samples "Alors on danse" by Belgian musician Stromae. In a statement, Joel Corry called himself a "big fan" of "Alors on danse", saying he wanted to "put a fun spin on it for summer 2021". Jax Jones said that he was "a big fan of Charli and Saweetie, having them on the song makes it feel like a moment with real synergy".

Critical reception
Writing for Cultr, Oliver Tryon called the song "party music at its very best". Althea Legaspi of Rolling Stone stated that "Out Out" was a "bumping new track", where "Charli XCX and Saweetie beckon all to hit the dancefloor". NME writer Greta Brereton labeled the single an "up-tempo dance track". In Complex, Jordan Rose said that the track was "a spectacular combination of all four unique skillsets" on the song, deeming it "made for the streets". Rose specifically praised Saweetie's feature, writing that "despite the song lacking any real core rap elements, Saweetie is still able to flow over the EDM beat".

Credits and personnel
Credits adapted from Tidal.
 Joel Corry – production, songwriting, programming
 Jax Jones – production, songwriting, programming
 Charli XCX – vocals, songwriting
 Saweetie – vocals, songwriting
 Lewis Thompson – production, songwriting, engineering, programming
 Neave Applebaum – production, songwriting, engineering, programming
 Amber Van Day – songwriting
 Jin Jin – songwriting
 Camille Purcell – songwriting
 Låpsley – songwriting
 Nonô – songwriting
 RØRY – songwriting
 Stromae – songwriting
 Kevin Grainger – mastering engineer

Charts

Weekly charts

Year-end charts

Certifications

Release history

References

2021 songs
2021 singles
Joel Corry songs
Jax Jones songs
Charli XCX songs
Saweetie songs
Songs written by Jax Jones
Songs written by Charli XCX
Songs written by Saweetie
Songs written by Jin Jin (musician)
Songs written by Stromae
Song recordings produced by Jax Jones
Asylum Records singles